The R564 is a Regional Route in Gauteng, South Africa. Its entire length is now within the metropolis of Johannesburg, connecting Roodepoort with Buccleuch.

Route
Its south-western end is a junction with the R41 in Roodepoort, at the southern part of the Florida suburb. It goes northwards through Florida as Westlake Road, meeting the R24 (Albertina SIsulu Road) at the next junction and bypassing Florida Lake, to reach a junction with Clarendon Drive, where it becomes Clarendon Drive westwards. At the next junction, it becomes Christiaan De Wet Drive northwards.

It runs north as Christiaan De Wet Drive, meeting the M18 just after Florida Park (west of Constantia Kloof) and meeting the M86 at Kloofendal, to form an interchange with the M47 (Hendrik Potgieter Drive) at Allen's Nek. It continues north-north-east through the suburbs of Weltevredenpark, and Radiokop, where it meets the M6 (John Vorster Drive), to exit Roodepoort and enter the northern suburbs of Randburg and Sandton.

It crosses Johannesburg's M5 road (Beyers Naude Drive) at Honeydew. Here, it becomes known as Northumberland Avenue and heads north-east through the suburbs of Sundowner and Northgate to reach a junction with the R512 (Malibongwe Drive), formerly Hans Strijdom Drive. Here, it becomes Witkoppen Road. Before the Malibongwe Drive junction, at the Olivedale Road junction, it passes by the Ticketpro Dome.

It continues in an east-north-easterly direction through the suburbs of Northriding, Bloubosrand, Johannesburg North, Jukskei Park, and Fourways. Here, it meets the southern terminus of the R552 (Cedar Road) and crosses the R511 (William Nicol Drive), the Fourways referred to in the suburb's name. After this intersection, it heads east, through Lone Hill, Paulshof (where it meets the M71 Main Road), Sunninghill (where it meets the M9 Rivonia Road) and Woodmead.

At the Eskom Megawatt Park, the road reaches a T-junction with Maxwell Drive and becomes Maxwell Drive eastwards (by way of a right turn), intersects with the R55 Road (Woodmead Drive), passes under the N1 just north of the Buccleuch interchange, to end at an intersection with the R101 (Pretoria Main Road) in the Buccleuch suburb.

References

Regional Routes in Gauteng
Streets and roads of Johannesburg